Sons of Otis are a Canadian stoner rock band from Toronto, Ontario, Canada.

History
The band was formed by Ken Baluke in Toronto sometime around the years 1992 and 1993. At first it was called just Otis, but for legal reasons had to be changed to "Sons of Otis". Strongly influenced by the underground heavy music of the time (Melvins/Fudge Tunnel/Shallow N.D), their first release, Paid to Suffer, came out in 1994.

In 1996 the band released the album Spacejumbofudge on the Hypnotic label. The album was re-released in 2000 by Mans Ruin after Hypnotic closed up. Temple Ball was released in 1999.  The band toured in Europe in 2000.

The band changed drummers frequently until May 2001 and at times resorted to a drum machine for recordings as well as performances.

In 2002 the band toured North America with Electric Wizard and Unearthly Trance.

In 2006, the band released an EP which included a cover of Hoyt Axton's "The Pusher".

Three more albums, X, Exile and Seismic were released between 2005 and 2012.  Isolation was released in 2020.

Members

Current
Ken Baluke – guitars, vocals
Jenn McCubbin – bass
Jay Lioumanis – drums

Past
John Moran – drums (1992–1995)

Emilio Mammone – drums (1996–1998, 1999–2001) - including 2000 European tour with Electric Wizard. 
Ryan Aubin 2001-2020

Session musicians
Tony Jacome – drums on the 'Songs for Worship (2001)

Discography
1994 - Paid to Suffer
1996 - Spacejumbofudge
1999 - Temple Ball  
2001 - Untitled EP (also known as The Pusher EP)
2001 - Songs for Worship
2005 - X
2007 - Sons of Otis / Queen Elephantine - Split
2009 - Exiled
2012 - Seismic
2018 - Live in Den Bosch
2020 - "Isolation"

References

External links
Official Website
Sons of Otis at Small Stone Records
Sons of Otis at Encyclopaedia Metallum

Canadian doom metal musical groups
Canadian stoner rock musical groups
Musical groups established in 1992
Canadian musical trios
Musical groups from Toronto
1992 establishments in Ontario